Robert Butler ( – 17 July 1905) was a New Zealand-Australian career criminal and murderer.

See also
List of serial killers by country

References

1850s births
1905 deaths
Australian murderers
Date of birth unknown
Executed Australian people
People executed by Australia by hanging
Suspected serial killers
Year of birth uncertain